Felix Braun (4 November 1885, Vienna – 29 November 1973, Klosterneuburg, Lower Austria) was an Austrian writer.

Life
Braun was born in Vienna, then capital of the Austro-Hungarian Empire, to a Jewish family. His mother died in 1888 during the birth of his sister, Käthe, who would also become a famous writer.  In 1904, he enrolled in German studies, as well as art history, at the University of Vienna, and took his doctorate four years later.  His literary publications began to appear in 1905 in the Neue Freie Presse, the Österreichische Rundschau, and in Die neue Rundschau.  He was appointed arts editor of the Berliner National-Zeitung in 1910.

In 1912, Braun married Hedwig Freund, but the couple would divorce in 1915.  While working as an editor at Verlag Georg Müller in Munich, he made the acquaintance of a number of important writers, among whom were Hans Carossa, Thomas Mann, and Rainer Maria Rilke.  From 1928 to 1938, he was a Privatdozent in German literature at Palermo and Padua.  He converted from Judaism to Catholicism in 1935.  To escape persecution by the Nazis, who banned his work, he immigrated in 1939 to the United Kingdom and remained there until 1951, teaching literature and art history.  After returning to Austria, Braun lectured at the Max Reinhardt Seminar and the University of Applied Arts Vienna.  Braun died in 1973 and was honored with a burial in the Zentralfriedhof of Vienna. In 1977, a lane in Vienna was named after him.

Writing
At the beginning of the 20th century, Braun belonged to the movement known as Young Vienna, where he found the company of such innovative writers as Stefan Zweig, Anton Wildgans, and Max Brod.  Braun was a Neo-Romantic, who wrote refined, cultivated poetry in multiple forms.  His work centered around the themes of religion, classical antiquity, and his Austrian homeland. Braun also served as secretary to the great Austrian writer Hugo von Hofmannsthal and formed a close friendship with his employer.

Braun edited and published a highly respected anthology of German lyric poetry, called Der Tausendjährige Rosenstrauch (The Thousand-Year Rose Bush), in 1937.  It has been reissued in numerous editions and remains one of the most popular collections of its kind.  He also translated the work of Thomas à Kempis and John of the Cross.

Awards and honors
 1947 Literary Prize of the City of Vienna
 1951 Grand Austrian State Prize for Literature
 1955 Ring of Honour of the City of Vienna
 1955 Founder Medal of the Federal Ministry for Education
 1965 Grillparzer Prize
 1966 Austrian Cross of Honour for Science and Art
 1977 Naming of Felix-Braun-Gasse in Vienna-Döbling

Publications
 Gedichte, poems, 1909
 Novellen und Legenden, 1910
 Der Schatten des Todes, novel, 1910
 Till Eulenspiegels Kaisertum, comedy, 1911
 Neues Leben, poems, 1912
 Verklärungen, 1916
 Tantalos, tragedy, 1917
 Die Träume des Vineta, legends, 1919
 Hyazinth und Ismene, dramatic lyrics, 1919
 Das Haar der Berenike, poems, 1919
 Attila, legend, 1920
 Aktaion, tragedy, 1921
 Die Taten des Herakles, novel, 1921
 Wunderstunden, short stories 1923
 Der unsichtbare Gast, novel, 1924, rev. 1928
 Der Schneeregenbogen, 1925
 Das innere Leben, poems, 1926
 Deutsche Geister, essay, 1925
 Die vergessene Mutter, short stories, 1925
 Esther, play, 1926
 Der Sohn des Himmels, mystery play, 1926
 Agnes Altkirchner, novel, 1927, rev. 1965
 Zwei Erzählungen von Kindern, 1928
 Die Heilung der Kinder, short stories, 1929
 Laterna magica, short stories and legends, 1932
 Ein indisches Märchenspiel, 1935
 Ausgewählte Gedichte, 1936
 Kaiser Karl V., tragedy, 1936
 Der Stachel in der Seele, novel, 1948
 Das Licht der Welt, autobiography, 1949, rev. 1962
 Die Tochter des Jairus, drama, 1950
 Briefe in das Jenseits, short stories, 1952
 Aischylos, dialogue, 1953
 Viola d`Amore, selected poems from 1903 to 1953, 1953
 Das musische Land, essays, 1952, rev. 1970
 Die Eisblume, essays, 1955
 Rudolf der Stifter, drama, 1955
 Joseph und Maria, drama, 1956
 Irina und der Zar, drama, 1956
 Orpheus, tragedy, 1956
 Unerbittbar bleibt Vergangenheit, selected works, 1957
 Gespräch über Stifters Mappe meines Urgroßvaters, 1958
 Der Liebeshimmel, 1959
 Palermo und Monreale, 1960
 Imaginäre Gespräche, 1960
 Rede auf Max Mell, 1960
 Zeitgefährten, Begegnungen, 1963
 Die vier Winde, Christmas stories, 1964
 Schönes in Süditalien - Palermo, essays, 1965
 Anrufe des Geistes, essays, 1965
 Aufruf zur Tafel, mystery, 1965
 Das weltliche Kloster, short stories, 1965
 Das Nelkenbeet, poems from 1914 to 1965, 1965
 Frühe und späte Dramen 1909-1967, 1971

References

 Biography from the Österreichisches Literaturarchiv (in German)

Further reading
 Dencker, Klaus Peter. Literarischer Jugendstil im Drama: Studien zu Felix Braun. Vienna: Schendl, 1971. .

1885 births
1973 deaths
Austrian art historians
Austrian male dramatists and playwrights
Journalists from Vienna
Austrian literary critics
Austrian male novelists
20th-century Austrian poets
Austrian male poets
Austrian Roman Catholics
Austrian Jews
Converts to Roman Catholicism from Judaism
Austrian male short story writers
Burials at the Vienna Central Cemetery
Recipients of the Grand Austrian State Prize
Recipients of the Austrian Cross of Honour for Science and Art
20th-century Austrian novelists
20th-century Austrian dramatists and playwrights
20th-century short story writers
20th-century Austrian male writers